The Texas County Courthouse is the historic courthouse serving Texas County, Oklahoma, located in the city of Guymon. The building is a four-story, red-brick structure; its fourth floor once functioned as a jail. The courthouse was designed by Maurice Jaynes using classical styles and built by the Kriepke Construction Co., a prominent builder in Oklahoma, for $200,000. Opened in 1927, the courthouse received praise from local newspapers in its first decade and came to symbolize the success and growth of the Oklahoma Panhandle. On August 24, 1984, the courthouse was added to the National Register of Historic Places.

References

Courthouses on the National Register of Historic Places in Oklahoma
Courthouses in Oklahoma
Government buildings completed in 1927
Buildings and structures in Texas County, Oklahoma
National Register of Historic Places in Texas County, Oklahoma